Crown Princess Märtha is a bronze statue of Crown Princess Märtha of Norway, by Kirsten Kokkin.

It is located at the Norwegian residence at Massachusetts Avenue and 34th Street, N.W. Washington, D.C. It was unveiled 18 September 2005.
A copy at Palace Park Oslo, was unveiled by King Harald V of Norway on 21 February 2007, on his 70th birthday. A third specimen was unveiled at the Norwegian Church in Stockholm on 30 October 2008.

See also
 List of public art in Washington, D.C., Ward 2

References

External links
Crown Princess Märtha of Norway, hmdb 
HRH Princess Martha of Norway Statue, dahoovsplace
"What to see: Statue of Crown Princess Märtha, Oslo", trondni,  12 September 2010
Crown Princess Märtha: The American Story, Georgia Public Broadcasting

2005 sculptures
Bronze sculptures in Washington, D.C.
Statues in Washington, D.C.
Bronze sculptures in Norway
Bronze sculptures in Sweden
Statues in Norway
Statues in Sweden
Sculptures of women in Washington, D.C.
Sculptures of women in Sweden
Sculptures of women in Norway
Embassy Row
Monuments and memorials to women
Outdoor sculptures in Washington, D.C.
2005 establishments in Washington, D.C.